Antillocoris is a genus of dirt-colored seed bugs in the family Rhyparochromidae. There are at least four described species in Antillocoris.

Species
These four species belong to the genus Antillocoris:
 Antillocoris discretus Barber, 1952
 Antillocoris minutus (Bergroth, 1895)
 Antillocoris pallidus (Uhler, 1894)
 Antillocoris pilosulus (Stal, 1874)

References

Rhyparochromidae
Articles created by Qbugbot